Leonidas Raymond Young (March 7, 1914 – July 31, 2008) was an American jazz drummer and singer. His musical family included his father Willis Young and his older brother, saxophonist Lester Young. In 1944 he played with Norman Granz's first "Jazz at the Philharmonic" concert.

Early life and education
Young was born in 1914 in New Orleans, Louisiana to Willis Young and Lizetta Teresa Johnson.  His father was a musician, as were other relatives.  His older brother Lester Young became a famed saxophonist.  Lee began playing from an early age and the family had a band for several years.

Career
In 1944 Lee Young was the drummer at Norman Granz's first "Jazz at the Philharmonic" concert, which also featured guitarist Les Paul, trombonist J.J. Johnson, and saxophonist Jean-Baptiste "Illinois" Jacquet.

Young played with such jazz and swing music notables as Mutt Carey, Fats Waller, Les Hite, Benny Goodman, and Lionel Hampton. In the 1950s Young played with Nat King Cole's trio. From the 1960s on, he worked as an artist & repertory man for such record labels as Vee-Jay and Motown. Lee Young never recorded as a session leader.

Discography
 Nat King Cole, Penthouse Serenade (Capitol, 1955)
 Nat King Cole, After Midnight (Capitol, 1956)
 Nat King Cole, The Piano Style of Nat King Cole (Capitol, 1956)
 Nat King Cole, At the Sands (Capitol, 1966)
 Benny Goodman, Mostly Sextets (Capitol, 1950)
 Lionel Hampton, Lionel Hampton with the Just Jazz All Stars (GNP, 1955)
 Oscar Moore, Jazz 1940 Era (Tampa, 1956)
 Andre Previn, Previn at Sunset (Black Lion, 1972)
 Dinah Washington, Mellow Mama (Delmark, 1992)

Notes

External links
Interview with Lee Young, Center for Oral History Research, UCLA Library Special Collections, University of California, Los Angeles
Lee Young's obituary in The New York Times

1914 births
2008 deaths
Jazz musicians from New Orleans
American jazz drummers
American jazz singers
20th-century American singers
20th-century American drummers
American male drummers
Singers from Louisiana
20th-century American male musicians
American male jazz musicians
King Cole Trio members